Nawab Wajid Ali Shah Prani Udyan, earlier known as Prince of Wales Zoological Gardens or popularly known as Lucknow Zoological Garden (Urdu: Lakhnaū Chiṛiyāghara), and Banaarsi Baag, is a  zoo located in the heart of the capital city of Uttar Pradesh named after Wajid Ali Shah - the last Nawab of Awadh. According to the Central Zoo Authority of India, it is a large zoo. The Prince of Wales Zoological Gardens, was established in the year 1921 to commemorate the visit of the Prince of Wales to Lucknow. The idea of establishing Zoological gardens at Lucknow emanated from Sir Harcourt Butler, the Governor of the State.

History 

The Uttar Pradesh Govt, vide letter No. 1552/14-4-2001-30/90, Van Anubhag-4, dated 4 June 2001, changed the name of "Prince of Wales Zoological Gardens.Trust, Lucknow" to "Lucknow Prani Udyan".

Management 
The zoo is being managed as a trust by the Zoo Advisory Committee, with Forest Secretary to the Govt. of Uttar Pradesh as Chairman, Principal Chief Conservator of Forests, Uttar Pradesh as Vice Chairman and Chief Wildlife Warden, Uttar Pradesh as Administrator. An officer of the rank of Deputy Conservator of Forests is posted as Director for over all day-to-day management of the zoo. In 2012, there was a proposition to start a cell-bank or a 'frozen zoo' for the conservation of endangered species. The proposal is still under consideration.

Attractions

Different Species
The zoo receives about 1,100,000–1,200,000 visitors annually. The zoo is home to 463 mammals, 298 birds, and 72 reptiles representing 97 species, including the royal Bengal tiger, white Bengal tiger, Asiatic lion, gray wolf, hoolock gibbon, Himalayan black bear, Indian rhinoceros, blackbuck, swamp deer, barking deer, hog deer, Asiatic elephant, giraffe, zebra, European otters, hill mynahs, giant squirrels, great pied hornbill, golden pheasant, silver pheasant etc. The zoo is successfully breeding swamp deer, blackbuck, hog deer and barking deer, white tiger, Indian wolf and several pheasants. It is one of the only two zoos in India to exhibit an orangutan (the other being the Kanpur Zoo).

Toy Train
A Toy train was started in 1969. The rolling stock consisting of engine and two coaches is the gift of Railway Board. The train was inaugurated on the Children's Day 14 November 1969 by the then Chief Minister of Uttar Pradesh. Rides start from Chandrapuri station and travels to almost every section of the zoo.

The glorious chapter in Lucknow’s history came to an end on Wednesday, 21 November 2013 as the journey of the ‘toy train’ that chugged in the city zoo for the last four decades, came to a halt. The 44-year–old toy train, that carried lakhs on it, was pulled out of service owing to plans of a revamp. The toy train has been parked in front of the state museum in the zoo premises. It was gifted to Lucknow zoo in 1969 by the Railway Board.

A new ‘Shatabdi–look–alike’ four–bogey toy train made by a Noida-based company started operating in the zoo premises on 28 February 2014. The new track alignment laid from 22 November 2013 onwards ensured that the new train could cover the maximum sightseeing area of the zoo.

Vintage train 
A British-era train will be an added attraction for visitors to the city zoo. The train was shifted to the zoo from Maharajganj, where it was lying almost discarded. In 1978 it was brought over to the forest department for use but being an uneconomical option, it was decided in 1981 that it would be phased out.

State Museum, Lucknow 
The Uttar Pradesh State Museum (Timing: 10.30 am to 4.30 pm; Closed on Mondays and certain public holidays) in Lucknow, was earlier situated in the Chattar Manzil and the Lal Baradari. It was shifted  during the year 1963 to the new building in Lucknow Zoo (Banarasi Bag or Prince Of Wales Zoological Garden). The initial collection centered around the arts of Avadh and objects related to the customs, habits, mythology and contemporary objects of Awadh, but  later on it was expanded to more interesting  excavated antiquities from nearby places of Lucknow  particularly  where Buddha grew up.

Today, the Museum has become  a centre of Lucknow's (Awadh's) sculpture, bronzes, paintings, natural history & anthropological specimens, coins, textiles and decorative arts. The (1000 BC) Egyptian Mummy and wooden sarcophagusure in the Prince of Wales Zoological Garden (Lucknow Zoo) are a centre of attraction. From the vast number of displayed objects, some hundred are rare and of great value. These include an inscribed wine jar bearing the name of Aurangzeb Alamgir (17th century), a jade chamakali with the name Jahangir and the date 1036 AD, a 16th-century painting of a scene from the Kalpasutra depicting an elephof India. Gradually, it expanded to include excavated antiquities from Piparahawa, Kapilavastu, where the Buddha grew up. Today, this has evolved into a multipurpose museum with sculpture, bronuated in the historic Dhoti Chhattar Manzil and the Lai Baradari. Among other attractions is a modern structant rider and a Jain mum, a 16th-century copy of the Harivansha in Persian with nine illustrations, rare silver and gold coins, a prehistoric anthropomorphic figure and a fossilised plant.

See also
Wajid Ali Shah
Kanpur Zoological Park
Shaheed Ashfaq Ullah Khan Prani Udyan
Etawah Safari Park

References

External links 
 
Official website of: "Central Zoo Authority of India" (CZA), Government of India

Zoos in Uttar Pradesh
Tourist attractions in Lucknow
Zoos established in 1921
1921 establishments in British India